ACS Catalysis is a monthly peer-reviewed scientific journal established in 2011 by the American Chemical Society. The journal covers research on all aspects of heterogeneous, homogeneous, and biocatalysis. The editor-in-chief is Cathleen Crudden, who assumed the position in early 2021. The journal received the Association of American Publishers’ PROSE Award for "Best New Journal in Science, Technology & Medicine" in 2013.

Types of content
The journal publishes the following  types of articles: Letters, Articles, Reviews, Perspectives, and Viewpoints. Reviews, Perspectives, and Viewpoints appear mostly on invitation.

Abstracting and indexing
The journal is abstracted and indexed in:
Chemical Abstracts Service
Current Contents/Physical, Chemical & Earth Sciences
Ei Compendex
Science Citation Index Expanded
Scopus
According to the Journal Citation Reports, the journal has a 2021 impact factor of 13.700.

References

External links

Catalysis
Monthly journals
Publications established in 2011
English-language journals
Catalysis